The Lawson Nunataks are a line of nunataks about  long, located 4 nautical miles southwest of Keim Peak in the Usarp Mountains of Antarctica. They were mapped by the United States Geological Survey from surveys and U.S. Navy air photos, 1960–62, and named by the Advisory Committee on Antarctic Names for Gerald J. Lawson, a United States Antarctic Research Program biologist at McMurdo Station, 1967–68.

References

Nunataks of Oates Land